Shintsuruko Dam is a rockfill dam located in Yamagata Prefecture in Japan. The dam is used for agriculture purposes. The catchment area of the dam is 56 km2. The dam impounds about 125  ha of land when full and can store 31500 thousand cubic meters of water. The construction of the dam was started on 1972 and completed in 1990.

References

Dams in Yamagata Prefecture
1990 establishments in Japan